Kevin Yurkus is an American professional basketball coach who was most recently head coach of Saigon Heat and the Vietnam national basketball team.

Coaching career

Club coaching career
From 2016–2017, he coached the Nakhon Pathom Mad Goats in Thailand. After that, he came to Vietnam to coach Cantho Catfish from 2017–2019.

National team coaching career
From 2019 to 2022, Yurkus was the head coach of the senior Vietnamese national basketball team.

References

External links
 Asia-basket.com profile

Videos
 HLV xuất sắc nhất VBA 2017: HLV Kevin Yurkus của Cantho Catfish – Youtube.com video 

Living people
American men's basketball coaches
American expatriate basketball people in Vietnam
Year of birth missing (living people)